Glenanna is a historic home located at Floyd, Floyd County, Virginia.  It was built in 1849, and is a large two-story, double pile, brick dwelling in the Greek Revival style.  The front facade features a massive, two-story, single-tier portico sheltering a small balcony on the second floor.  The portico, a small conservatory, and a kitchen wing were added in the early-20th century. Also on the property are a contributing kitchen / servant house; a well shelter / dairy; and a smokehouse.

It was listed on the National Register of Historic Places in 2002.  It is located in the Floyd Historic District.

References

Houses on the National Register of Historic Places in Virginia
Houses completed in 1849
Greek Revival houses in Virginia
Houses in Floyd County, Virginia
National Register of Historic Places in Floyd County, Virginia
Historic district contributing properties in Virginia
1849 establishments in Virginia